The Yamaha DX9 is a spin off synthesizer of the family of the DX7 built by Yamaha. It uses FM synthesis and has 16 note polyphony; however, it only has four FM operators for sound generation compared with six on the DX7. It is the least complex of the DX range of synthesizers and has only 20 on board memory locations.

Typical sounds
The DX9 contains 20 pre-programmed voices which include: brass, string sounds, piano, organ and synth sounds.

Storage
User created voices (sounds) can be saved on cassette tape for later use.

See also
 Yamaha DX1
 Yamaha DX7
 Yamaha DX11
 Yamaha DX21

References

Further reading
http://www.synthzone.com/midi/yamaha/dx9/yamaha_dx9_owners_manual.pdf

DX7
Polyphonic synthesizers
Digital synthesizers